Aprostocetus hagenowii is a species of parasitoid wasp. It is a parasitoid of cockroach oothecae.

References

Eulophidae
 Insects described in 1852
Biological pest control wasps